Bruno Bauer (6 September 180913 April 1882) was a German philosopher and theologian. As a student of G. W. F. Hegel, Bauer was a radical Rationalist in philosophy, politics and Biblical criticism. Bauer investigated the sources of the New Testament and, beginning with Hegel's Hellenophile orientation, concluded that early Christianity owed more to ancient Greek philosophy               (Stoicism) than to Judaism.

Bruno Bauer is also known for his association and sharp break with Karl Marx and Friedrich Engels, and by his later association with Max Stirner and Friedrich Nietzsche. Starting in 1840, he began a series of works arguing that Jesus of Nazareth was a 2nd-century fusion of Jewish, Greek, and Roman theology.

Biography 
Bauer was the son of a painter in a porcelain factory and his wife at Eisenberg in Saxe-Gotha-Altenburg. He studied at the Friedrich Wilhelm University in Berlin from spring (1828 to spring 1832). He became associated with the "Right Hegelians'" under Philip Marheineke, who engaged Bauer years later to edit the second edition of Hegel's "Lectures on the Philosophy of Religion" (1818–1832). This was to become one of Bauer's best-known works—a three-volume, critical edition.

(In 1834 he began to teach in Berlin as a licentiate of theology, and in 1839 was transferred to the University of Bonn.)

In 1838 he published his  (Critical Exhibition of the Religion of the Old Testament) in two volumes. This work showed Bauer was faithful to the Hegelian Rationalist theology that interpreted all miracles in Naturalistic terms.

Consistent with his Hegelian Rationalism, Bauer continued in 1840 with,  (Critique of the Evangelical History of John). In 1841 Bauer continued his Rationalist theme with,  (Critique of the Evangelical History of the Synoptics).

At no time in his writing was Bauer ever an orthodox Christian. From his earliest days of academic scholarship under Hegel, Bauer maintained a firm criticism of Immanuel Kant and a firm fealty to both Hegel's dialectic and his Rationalist Theology.

He was called a "Right Hegelian" by his contemporary David Strauss.  (cf. David Strauss, In Defense of My 'Life of Jesus' Against the Hegelians, 1838).  Also, Karl Marx and Friedrich Engels accused Bauer of being a right-wing fanatic in their book
The Holy Family: Against Bruno Bauer and Co. (1845), and in The German Ideology(1846).  Further, several scholars (e.g., Dr. Lawrence Stepelevich) still maintain that Bauer's book, Trumpet of the Last Judgment Against Hegel the Atheist and Antichrist (1841), was a genuinely right-wing production. 

Despite this, Bruno Bauer was much later accused of being a "Left Hegelian" because of his association, or rather his early leadership, of the Young Hegelians. The labels of 'Left' and 'Right' were only placed on Bruno Bauer by others; never by himself.

From 1839 to 1841, Bauer was a teacher, mentor and close friend of Karl Marx, but in 1841 they came to a break. Marx, with Friedrich Engels, had formulated a socialist and communistic program that Bruno Bauer firmly rejected. Marx and Engels in turn expressed their break with Bauer in two books: The Holy Family (1845) and The German Ideology (1846).

The Prussian Minister of Education, Altenstein, sent Bauer to the University of Bonn, to protect his Rationalist Theology from the critique of the Berlin orthodox, as well as to win over Bonn University to Hegelianism. Bauer, however, created many enemies at pietist-dominated Bonn university, where he openly taught Rationalism in his new position as professor of theology. Bauer attested in letters during this time that he tried to provoke a scandal, to force the government either to give complete freedom of science and teaching to its university professors, or to openly express its anti-enlightenment position by removing him from his post.

The pro-Hegelian minister Altenstein died in 1840 and was replaced by the anti-Hegelian Eichhorn. The government officials asked for advice from the theology departments of its universities. Except for the Hegelian Marheineke, most said that a professor of Protestant theology should not be allowed to teach "atheism" to his student priests. As Bauer was unwilling to compromise his Rationalism, the Prussian government in 1842 revoked his teaching license. After the setbacks of the revolutions of 1848, Bauer left the city. He lived an ascetic and stoic life in the countryside of Rixdorf near Berlin.

Bauer continued to write, including more than nine theological tomes, in twelve volumes. The tomes varied between theology, modern history and politics. He published them at his own expense while working at his family's tobacco shop.

Between 1843 and 1845, Bauer published  (History of Politics, Culture and Enlightenment in the 18th Century, in 4 volumes). In 1847 Bauer published  (History of the French Revolution, in 3 volumes).

In these works Bauer led the academic movement to subject the Bible to historical and literary criticism.

In 1879 Bauer published  (Christ and the Caesars), and in 1882 he published  (Disraeli's Romantic and Bismarck's Socialist Imperialism).

Bauer's final book on theology, Christ and the Caesars (1879), was his crowning effort to justify Hegel's position that Christian theology owed at least as much to Greco-Roman classical philosophy as it owed to Judaism.

Bruno Bauer died at Rixdorf in 1882.

Conflict with David Strauss 
Shortly after the death of Hegel, another writer, David Strauss, who had been a reader of Hegel's writings, arrived in Berlin (1831). As a student of Friedrich Schleiermacher he wrote a controversial book which is now famous, entitled, The Life of Jesus Critically Examined, usually referred to as The Life of Jesus (1835). In this book David Strauss announced his own landmark theory of 'demythologization' as an approach to the Gospels, but he also attempted to use Hegel's name and fame in the dedication of his book. 

In the year of its publication, Strauss's book raised a storm of controversy. The Prussian king Friedrich Wilhelm IV tightened control of the Prussian University system, favoring an ultra-conservative approach to the New Testament. He strongly objected to the writing of David Strauss, and so he also blamed the Hegelian school in general, partly because Strauss had named Hegel in his dedication. 

Bruno Bauer, now 26 years old, was chosen by the Hegelians to refute David Strauss in the Hegelian  (Journal of Philosophical Criticism). Bauer demonstrated that Strauss had thoroughly misrepresented Hegel. Bauer also demonstrated that David Strauss' dialectic was taken from Schleiermacher (who was antagonistic toward Hegel).

Although Strauss's book had sold well throughout Europe, in 1838 Strauss published a rebuttal to Bruno Bauer in a booklet entitled, In Defense of my Life of Jesus against the Hegelians (1838). In that book Strauss admitted publicly that his position had not been inspired by Hegel's philosophy after all, nor by Hegel's theology (and its dialectical Trinity). This firmly divorced Strauss of the Hegelian philosophy. 

However, in this final exchange with the Hegelians, David Strauss criticized them in a way that became famous. Strauss invented terms still in use today: a Right Hegelian would uncritically defend all positions of orthodox Christian theology, he said, while a Left Hegelian takes a liberal and progressive approach to Scripture.

The Prussian monarch, objecting to these debates, banned many Hegelians from teaching in Universities, including Bruno Bauer. For the rest of his life, Bauer continued to be bitter towards Strauss, and the elderly Bruno Bauer encouraged a young Friedrich Nietzsche to write articles sharply critical of David Strauss. Nietzsche during this early period called Bruno Bauer, "[his] entire reading public!"

Views on Christian Origins 
Bauer wrote a criticism of the New Testament. David Strauss, in his Life of Jesus, had accounted for the Gospel narratives as half-conscious products of the mythic instinct in the early Christian communities. Bauer ridiculed Strauss's notion that a community could produce a connected narrative. Rather, he believed only a single writer could be responsible for the first Gospel. His own contention, embodying a theory of Christian Gottlob Wilke (Der Urevangelist, 1838), was that the original narrative was the Gospel of Mark.

For Bauer, the Gospel of Mark was completed in the reign of Hadrian (117–138 CE), although its prototype, the 'Ur-Marcus' (identifiable within the Gospel of Mark by critical analysis), was begun around the time of Josephus and the Roman–Jewish Wars (66-70 CE). Bauer, like other advocates of the 'Marcan Hypothesis', argued that all Synoptic Gospels had used the Gospel of Mark as their narrative model.

In 1906 Albert Schweitzer wrote that Bauer "originally sought to defend the honor of Jesus by rescuing his reputation from the inane parody of a biography that the Christian apologists had forged." However, he eventually came to the belief that it was a complete fiction and "regarded the Gospel of Mark not only as the first narrator, but even as the creator of the gospel history, thus making the latter a fiction and Christianity the invention of a single original evangelist" (Otto Pfleiderer).

Although Bauer investigated the 'Ur-Marcus', it was his remarks on the current version of the Gospel of Mark that captured popular attention. In particular, some key themes in the Gospel of Mark appeared to be literary. The Messianic Secret theme, in which Jesus continually performed wonders and then continually told the viewers not to tell anybody that he did this, seemed to Bauer to be an example of fiction. If the Messianic Secret is a fiction, Bauer wrote, the redactor who added that theme was probably the final redactor of our current version of the Gospel of Mark. In 1901, Wilhelm Wrede would make his lasting fame by repeating many of these ideas in his book, The Messianic Secret.

For some influential theologians in the Tübingen School, several Pauline epistles were regarded as forgeries of the 2nd century. Bauer radicalized that position by suggesting that all Pauline epistles were forgeries written in the West in antagonism to the Paul of The Acts. Bauer observed a preponderance of the Greco-Roman element over the Jewish element in Christian writings, and he added a wealth of historical background to support his theory. However, modern scholars such as E. P. Sanders and John P. Meier have disputed the theory and attempted to demonstrate a mainly Jewish historical background. Other authors, such as Rudolf Bultmann, agreed that a Greco-Roman element was dominant.

According to Bauer, the writer of Mark's gospel was "an Italian, at home both in Rome and Alexandria"; Matthew's gospel was written by "a Roman, nourished by the spirit of Seneca"; and Christianity is essentially "Stoicism triumphant in a Jewish garb."

Bauer added a deep review of European literature in the 1st century. In his estimation, many key themes of the New Testament (especially those that are opposed to themes in the Old Testament), can be found with relative ease in Greco-Roman literature that flourished during the 1st century. Such a position was also maintained by some Jewish scholars.

Bauer's final book, Christ and the Caesars (1879) offers an analysis that shows common keywords in the texts of 1st-century writers like Seneca the Stoic and The New Testament. While that had been perceived even in ancient times, the ancient explanation was that Seneca was a secret Christian. Bauer was the first to attempt to demonstrate carefully that some New Testament writers freely borrowed from Seneca. One modern explanation is that common cultures share common thought forms and common patterns of speech, and similarities do not necessarily indicate borrowing.

In Christ and the Caesars, Bauer argued that Judaism entered Rome during the era of the Maccabees and increased in population and influence in Rome since then. He cited literature from the 1st century to strengthen his case that Jewish influence in Rome was far greater than historians had yet reported. The imperial throne was influenced by the Jewish religious genius, he said, citing Herod's relation with the Caesar family, as well as the famous relationship between Josephus and the Flavians, Vespasian and Titus. Also, a poem by Horace relates his greeting his Roman friend on a Saturday on his way to the local Synagogue.

According to Bauer, Julius Caesar sought to interpret his own life as an Oriental miracle story, and Augustus Caesar completed that job by commissioning Virgil to write his Aeneid, making Caesar into the Son of Venus and a relative of the Trojans, thereby justifying the Roman conquest of Greece and insinuating Rome into a much older history.

By contrast, said Bauer, Vespasian was far more fortunate since he had Josephus himself to link his reign with an Oriental miracle. Josephus had prophesied that Vespasian would become Emperor of Rome and thus ruler of the world. Since that actually came true, it smoothly insinuated Rome into Jewish history. After this, the Roman conquest of Judea would take on new historical dimensions.

According to Albert Schweitzer, Bauer's criticisms of the New Testament provided the most interesting questions about the historical Jesus that he had seen.

The second-last chapter of his Quest suggests that Schweitzer's own theology was partly based on Bauer's writings. The title of that chapter is "Thoroughgoing Skepticism and Eschatology" in which Schweitzer clashes head-on with Wilhelm Wrede, who had recently (in 1905) proposed the theory of a Messianic Secret. Wrede's theory claimed that Jesus's continual commands to his followers to "say nothing to anybody" after each miracle was performed could be explained only as a literary invention of this Gospel writer. (That is, Wrede was the thoroughgoing skeptic, and Schweitzer was the thoroughgoing eschatologist.) Schweitzer began by showing that Wrede had merely copied the idea from Bauer. Then, 40 listed another forty brilliant criticisms from Bauer (pp. 334–335) and disagreed with some of them (such as the so-called Messianic Secret) and considered others indispensable for any modern theology of the Gospel.

That line of criticism has value in emphasizing the importance of studying the influence of environment in the formation of the Christian Scriptures. Bauer was a man of restless creativity, interdisciplinary activity and independent judgment. Many reviewers have charged that Bauer's judgment was ill-balanced. Because of the controversial nature of his work as a social theorist, theologian and historian, Bauer was banned from public teaching by a Prussian monarch. After many years of similar censorship, Bauer came to resign himself to his place as a freelance critic, rather than an official teacher.

Douglas Moggach published The Philosophy and Politics of Bruno Bauer in 2003. It is the most comprehensive overview of Bauer's life and works in English to date. Bauer's biography has now obtained more kindly reviews, even by opponents. In his own day, his opponents often respected him since he was not afraid of taking a line on principle. The topic of Bauer's personal religious views or lack thereof is a continuing debate in contemporary scholarship about Bauer. 

One modern writer, Paul Trejo, has made the case that Bauer remained a radical theologian who only criticized specific types of Christianity and that Bauer maintained a Hegelian interpretation of Christianity throughout his life. According to Trejo, Bauer's allegedly radical book Christianity Exposed (1843) was actually mild, setting only one large sect of Christianity against another.

Trejo also wrote that Bauer's Trumpet of the Last Judgment against Hegel the Atheist and Antichrist was merely a comedy, actually a prank, in which Bauer pretended to be a right-wing cleric attacking Hegel. The prank worked, wrote Trejo, and Bauer had a great laugh at the expense of anti-Hegelian clerics. Bauer was a legitimate Christian of the Hegelian school, wrote Trejo, who opposed only the "ingenuous" or literalist type of Christianity.

Antisemitism 
Beginning in 1848, critics accused Bauer of promoting a virulent antisemitism in print within reactionary circles. Bauer's view of Jews and Judaism is considered by some to have been absolutely negative, both when considering the past and when contemplating the present.

Others, like Trejo argue that the charge is spurious, mainly promoted by “neo-Marxists” who wish to deflect charges of Marx's own Anti-Semitism.

In 1843, Bauer wrote The Jewish Question, which was responded to in a pamphlet written by Karl Marx, entitled, "On the Jewish Question". According to Marx, Bauer argued that the Jews were responsible for their own misfortunes in European society since they had "made their nest in the pores and interstices of bourgeois society". 

Jacob Katz contextualizes Bauer's antisemitism with his passionate anti-Christianity, the latter of which caused Bauer to lose his professorship. Although, according to Katz, Bauer was "equally impatient with Christianity and Judaism", Bauer would frequently diverge from a review or opinion piece on a Jewish writer or thinker into a general consideration of "the Jew as a type", grasping at whatever negative characteristics he could find.

Others, like Trejo, write that Bruno Bauer is widely accused of being a "passionate anti-Christian" on the one hand, and is also widely accused of being a right-wing Christian on the other hand. Karl Marx and Frederick Engels, for example, wrote two books against Bruno Bauer, ridiculing him as a right-wing Hegelian. There's no shortage of scholars, further, who join translator Lawrence Stepelevich in claiming that Bauer's publication, the 'Trumpet of the Last Judgment Against Hegel the Atheist and Antichrist' (1841) was an earnestly right-wing Christian protest against Hegel. So, the histories about Bruno Bauer are inconsistent and self-contradictory. 

A few scholars accuse Bauer of anti-Semitism, e.g. David Leopold's article, "The Hegelian Antisemitism of Bruno Bauer." History of European Ideas 25 (1999): 179-206</ref> argues that Hegel and Bauer were both anti-Semites. Actually, Bauer 1863 booklet, Judaism Abroad, did remark that Jewish readers should wait for their rights in Germany until the average German received his rights.

Political Ideology 
The first English-language rendering of Bruno Bauer's career was published in March, 2003 by Douglas Moggach, a professor at the University of Ottawa. His book is entitled, The Philosophy and Politics of Bruno Bauer. Moggach develops a republican interpretation of Bruno Bauer, in which Bauer is portrayed as reaching atheist conclusions because of his political commitments to free self-consciousness and autonomy, and his criticisms of the Restoration union of church and state. Other scholars continue to dispute that portrait.

Bauer was very hard to classify politically, being claimed by both the left and right wing Hegelians.

During Bauer's direct studying under Hegel, he was awarded an academic prize when he was about 20 years old. Hegel died when Bruno Bauer was 22 years old. Perhaps this affected Bauer's personality; he may have seen himself as sitting quite close to the highest academic post in Prussia, and that might have gone to his head. 

When Hegel unexpectedly died in 1831, possibly of cholera, Bruno Bauer's official connections were drastically reduced. Bauer had few powerful friends during the fallout of Hegel's death, as shown by the fact that Bruno Bauer and many Hegelians lost their beloved University positions during that decade. The struggle with David Strauss and especially with the Prussian monarchy had set Bruno Bauer back quite a bit. This also affected Bauer's personality.

Bauer went underground and began to write Hegelian newspapers here and there. In this journey he met some socialists, including Karl Marx, his former student, and Marx' new friends, Friedrich Engels and Arnold Ruge. They were all left-wing radicals. Bauer was not a left-wing radical, but he was happy to be their leader if it could lead them back to a Hegelian understanding of the dialectic. Another member of those Young Hegelians, Max Stirner, became Bauer's lifelong friend. Although Bauer was not a radical egoist, he preferred the company of Stirner to that of Marx, Engels and Ruge, whom he abandoned -- and who abandoned him. 

The two new works by Marx and Engels that were critical of several Young Hegelians, including Bauer, were The Holy Family, and The German Ideology.

Bruno Bauer met with Marx again in London in the mid-1850s, while visiting his exiled brother Edgar there. According to Marx's correspondence with Engels, Bauer presented him with a copy of Hegel's Science of Logic. Marx referred to this volume while completing his drafts of 'Capital'.

Bauer had already turned away from the socialism and communism of Marx and Engels, so he was immune to the barbs they wrote in The Holy Family or Critique of Critical Criticism. Against Bruno Bauer and Company by his pupils, Marx and Engels. Nevertheless, he had fallen quite far – from a favorite son of Hegel himself down to an enemy of both the right-wing and the left-wing as well. He found very few friends in this intellectual position aside from Max Stirner. 

Suppressed and condemned by both the right-wing and the left-wing, the once-influential Bruno Bauer finally settled into his family's tobacco shop to earn his living, though he continued to write. He never married, but he wrote many books, all the way to 1879. He died in 1883.

Argument against the existence of Jesus 
Bauer became the first author to systematically argue that Jesus did not exist. 

Early in his academic career, however, Bruno Bauer was certain that Jesus certainly did exist -- it was only that ordinary theologians continued to heap legend after legend onto the real, historical Jesus. In the 1906 book by the famous Albert Schweitzer, The Quest of the Historical Jesus, p. 143, Bruno Bauer is quoted as writing: "We save the honor of Jesus when we restore His Person to life from the state of inanition to which the apologists have reduced it, and give it once more a living relation to history, which it certainly possessed -- that can no longer be denied." 

Beginning in 1841, in his Criticism of the Gospel History of the Synoptics, Bauer argued that the Biblical Jesus was primarily a literary figure. However, he left open the question of whether a historical Jesus existed at all until his 1851 work, Criticism of the Gospels and History of their Origin and then in 1879 proposed his theory for the true origin of Jesus in Christ and the Caesars, namely, that the Gospel writers freely used Greco-Roman classics in their mythical reconstructions of the life of the real man, Jesus of Galilee.

We should note, however, that in this opinion, Bruno Bauer remained close to the dialectical theology of GWF Hegel. Hegel hailed from the Rationalist School of Biblical critique, starting with Johann Gottfried Herder and Heinrich Paulus (who had been Hegel's employer during his early days). There was in fact a large movement of Bible Rationalism in the early 1800's. Hegel and Bauer were both part of that movement. Hasty writers call that atheism. Actually, the literature of Hegel and Bauer affirm that Jesus was real -- but that typical theologians had interpreted Jesus all wrong.

Bauer's 1842 work, Kritik der evangelischen Geschichte der Synoptiker und des Johannes (3 vol) debated whether the gospels were purely literary, with no historically authentic material. While not yet rejecting the historicity of Jesus, Bauer denied the historicity of a supernatural Christ (viz. Jesus—a natural human). 

Bauer wrote, "Everything that the historical Christ is, everything that is said of Him, everything that is known of Him, belongs to the world of imagination, that is, of the imagination of the Christian community, and therefore has nothing to do with any man who belongs to the real world." (see David Strauss (1808–1874) who pioneered the search for the "Historical Jesus" by also rejecting the supernatural events of "The Christ", in his 1835 work, Life of Jesus).

In his Criticism of the Pauline Epistles (1850–1852) and in A Critique of the Gospels and a History of their Origin (1850–1851), Bauer argued that Jesus had not existed. Schweitzer notes, "At the end of his study of the Gospels, Bauer is inclined to make the decision of the question whether there ever was a historic Jesus depend on the result of a further investigation which he proposed to make into the Pauline Epistles. It was not until ten years later (1850–1851) that he accomplished this task, (. (Criticism of the Pauline Epistles.) Berlin, 1850–1852.) and applied the result in his new edition of the "Criticism of the Gospel History." ( (Criticism of the Gospels and History of their Origin.) 2 vols., Berlin, 1850–1851.) The result is negative: there never was any historical Jesus."

In Christ and the Caesars (1879) he suggested that Christianity was a synthesis of the Stoicism of Seneca the Younger and of the Jewish theology of Philo as developed by pro-Roman Jews such as Josephus. Bauer's work was heavily criticized at the time; in 1842 he was removed from his position at the University of Bonn. Still, Bruno Bauer's works were well-cited throughout Europe for the rest of the 19th century. In the 20th century, his work had little impact on future myth theorists.

Christ myth theory proponents still assert the threefold argument originally asserted by Bauer -- allegedly:
 that the New Testament has no historical value.
 that there are no non-Christian references to Jesus Christ dating back to the first century.
 that Christianity had syncretistic or mythical roots.

This one-sided interpretation by author Van Voorst is quite common, but others, like Trejo, say that such an interpretation lacks the nuance that we find inside the pages of Bruno Bauer's actual works. They say that Bauer didn't deny the existence of Jesus of Galilee -- but merely questioned the legends and Nature miracles told about him. Like GWF Hegel and the Rationalist School, Bruno Bauer would focus on the historical environment and the teachings of Jesus, rather than engage in sophomoric debates about the reality of Nature miracles. Objective scholarship on Bruno Bauer is overdue.

Legacy 
Bauer's scholarship was buried by German academia, and he remained a pariah, until Albert Kalthoff rescued his works from neglect and obscurity. Kalthoff revived Bauer's Christ Myth thesis in his Das Christus-Problem. Grundlinien zu einer Sozialtheologie (The Problem of Christ: Principles of a Social Theology, 1902) and Die Entstehung des Christentums, Neue Beiträge zum Christusproblem (The Rise of Christianity, 1904).

Arthur Drews noted Bauer's views in his own work The Denial of the Historicity of Jesus in Past and Present, "Christianity is the product of the intimidated class of Romans who needed a straw of hope and faith in their struggle against the egoism of Caesars. It's absurd to suppose it to be originating from Hierosolyma [Jerusalem]. The origin of the Gospel literature is then reexamined. Originally, it's just a demonstration of the new principle of freedom, in rebellion against the law-dominated world, represented by Judaism. The Gospels demonstrate various steps in the evolution of this esteem. The main factor of influence was of the Roman empire, whose oppression forced the community to look for hope in a kingdom of heavens and exterminating the kingdom of Rome to make it possible. ...Absolutely no such thing as a historical Jesus of Galilee is needed to explain the genesis of Mark's gospel."

Despite these attempts of revival, Bauer's positions are nowadays considered fringe. Already in 1906, Albert Schweitzer, while appreciating Bauer's earlier work, was sharply critical towards his later support for the Christ myth theory, writing in his book The Quest of the Historical Jesus that Bauer "originally sought to defend the honor of Jesus by rescuing his reputation from the inane parody of a biography that the Christian apologists had forged." However, he eventually came to the belief that it was a complete fiction and "regarded the Gospel of Mark not only as the first narrator, but even as the creator of the gospel history, thus making the latter a fiction and Christianity the invention of a single original evangelist" (Otto Pfleiderer). 

In modern scholarship, the Christ myth theory is a fringe theory, which finds virtually no support from scholars, to the point of being addressed in footnotes or almost completely ignored due to the obvious weaknesses they espouse. Common criticisms against the Christ myth theory include: general lack of expertise or relationship to academic institutions and current scholarship; reliance on arguments from silence, dismissal of what sources actually state, and superficial comparisons with mythologies.

Major works 
De pulchri principiis, Prussian royal prize manuscript, first published as Prinzipien des Schönen. De pulchri principiis. Eine Preisschrift (1829), new ed. Douglas Moggach und Winfried Schultze (Berlin: Akademie Verlag, 1996).
"Rezension (review): Das Leben Jesu, David Friedrich Strauss," Jahrbücher für wissenschaftliche Kritik, Dec. 1835; May 1836.
Kritik der Geschichte der Offenbarung. Die Religion des alten Testaments in der geschichtlichen Entwicklung ihrer Prinzipien dargestellt 2 vol. (Berlin, 1838).
Herr Dr. Hengstenberg (Berlin, 1839).
Kritik der evangelischen Geschichte des Johannes (Bremen, 1840)
"Der christliche Staat und unsere Zeit," Hallische Jahrbücher für deutsche Wissenschaft und Kunst, June 1841.
Kritik der evangelischen Geschichte der Synoptiker, 2 vols. (Leipzig, 1841)
Die Posaune des jüngsten Gerichts über Hegel, den Atheisten und Antichristen (Leipzig, 1841); trans. L. Stepelevich, The Trumpet of the Last Judgement against Hegel the Atheist and Antichrist. An Ultimatum (Lewiston, N.Y.: E. Mellen Press, 1989)
 (anon.) Hegels Lehre von der Religion und Kunst von dem Standpuncte des Glaubens aus beurteilt (Leipzig, 1842); new ed. Aalen (Scientia Verlag, 1967)
Die gute Sache der Freiheit und meine eigene Angelegenheit (1842)
Die Judenfrage (1843) ("The Jewish Question")
Das Entdeckte Christentum (Zürich, 1843, banned and destroyed, into oblivion until 1927: ed. Barnikol); transl. Esther Ziegler, Christianity Exposed (MellenPress, 2002)
"Die Fähigkeit der heutigen Juden und Christen, frei zu werden," in Georg Herwegh (ed.), Einundzwanzig Bogen aus der Schweiz (Zürich und Winterthur, 1843)
Geschichte der Politik, Kultur und Aufklärung des 18. Jahrhunderts, 4 vol. (1843–45)
"Die Gattung und die Masse", Allg. Lit.-Ztg. X, September 1844
Geschichte Deutschlands und der französischen Revolution unter der Herrschaft Napoleons, 2 vols. (1846)
Der Ursprung des Galaterbriefs (Hempel, 1850)
Kritik der paulinischen Briefe ("Critique of Paul's epistles") (Berlin, 1850–1851)
Der Ursprung des ersten Korintherbriefes (Hempel, 1851)
Kritik der Evangelien und Geschichte ihres Ursprungs, 3 vols. (1850–51); 4th vol. Die theologische Erklärung der Evangelien (Berlin, 1852).
Russland und das Germanentum 2 vol. (1853)
 Das Judenthum in der Fremde. (Berlin, 1863).
Philo, Renan und das Urchristentum (Berlin, 1874)
Einfluss des englischen Quäkerthums auf die deutsche Cultur und auf das englisch-russische Project einer Weltkirche (Berlin, 1878)
Christus und die Cäsaren...Transl. German to English by Helmut Brunar and Byron Marchant, Christ and the Caesars... available (Bloomington IN: Xlibris Publishing, 2015).
Disraelis romantischer und Bismarcks sozialistischer Imperialismus (1882)

Translations 
The great bulk of Bauer's writings have still not been translated into English. Only three books by Bauer have been formally translated:

(1) A comedic parody, The Trumpet of the Last Judgment Against Hegel the Atheist and Antichrist (1841, trans. Lawrence Stepelevich, 1989). 

(2) Christianity Exposed: A Recollection of the 18th Century and a Contribution to the Crisis of the 19th Century (tr. Esther Ziegler and Jutta Hamm, ed. Paul Trejo, 2002).

(3) Bruno Bauer's, Christ and the Caesars: The Origin of Christianity from the Mythology of Rome and Greece (1879) was ably translated into English by scholars Helmut Brunar and Byron Marchant (2015, Xlibris Publishing).

References

Bibliography

Further reading 
 
 Barnikol, Ernst, 1972, Bruno Bauer, Studien und Materialien
 Brazill, W.J., 1970, The Young Hegelians (New Haven: Yale University Press).
 Eberlein, Hermann-Peter, Bruno Bauer. Vom Marx-Freund zum Antisemiten (Berlin: Karl Dietz-Verlag, 2009).
 Engels, Friedrich, 1882, "Bruno Bauer und das Urchristentum," Sozialdemokrat, May 4 and 11.
 Eßbach, Wolfgang, 1988, Die Junghegelianer. Soziologie einer Intellektuellengruppe (München: Wilhelm Fink Verlag).
 Kautsky, Karl, 1908, Der Ursprung des Christentums (Stuttgart: Dietz).
 Kautsky, Karl, 1915, Nationalstaat, imperialistischer Staat und Staatenbund (Nürnberg)
 Kegel, Martin, 1908, Bruno Bauer Und Seine Theorien Über Die Entstehung Des Christentums
 Leopold, David, 1999, "The Hegelian Antisemitism of Bruno Bauer," History of European Ideas 25 (1999)
 Leopold, David, 2007, The Young Karl Marx: German Philosophy, Modern Politics, and Human Flourishing (Cambridge Un. Press)
 Löwith, Karl, 1967, From Hegel to Nietzsche (Garden City: Doubleday).
 Mah, Harold, 1987, The End of Philosophy and the Origin of Ideology. Karl Marx and the Crisis of the Young Hegelians (Berkeley: Un. of California Press).
 Marx, Karl, 1975, On the Jewish Question, Collected Works, vol. 3 (New York: Int'l Publishers)
 Marx, Karl, Frederick Engels, 1975, The Holy Family, or Critique of Critical Criticism, Collected Works, vol. 4 (New York: Int'l Publishers); The German Ideology, Collected Works, vol. 5 (New York: Int'l Publishers, 1976)
 McLellan, David, 1969, The Young Hegelians and Karl Marx (Toronto: Macmillan).
 Mehlhausen, Joachim, Dialektik, Selbstbewusstsein und Offenbarung. Die Grundlagen der spekulativen Orthodoxie Bruno Bauers in ihrem Zusammenhang mit der Geschichte der theologischen Hegelschule dargestellt (Bonn 1965)
 Moggach, Douglas, ed., 2006, The New Hegelians: Politics and Philosophy in the Hegelian School (Cambridge Un. Press).
 Rosen, Zvi, 1978, Bruno Bauer and Karl Marx (the Hague: Nijhoff).
 Sass, Hans-Martin, 1967, "Bruno Bauers Idee der Rheinischen Zeitung", Zeitschrift für Religions- und Geistesgeschichte 19, 221–276.
 Schweitzer, Albert, 1906/1913, The Quest of the Historical Jesus. A Critical Study of its Progress from Reimarus to Wrede (Johns Hopkins Un. Press, 1998)
 Stepelevich, L.S., ed., 1983, The Young Hegelians, An Anthology (Cambridge Un. Press).
 Toews, J.E., 1980, Hegelianism. The Path toward Dialectical Humanism (Cambridge Un. Press).
 Tomba, Massimiliano, 2002, Crisi e critica in Bruno Bauer. Il principio di esclusione come fondamento del politico (Naples: Bibliopolis); transl. Krise und Kritik bei Bruno Bauer. Kategorien des Politischen im nachhegelschen Denken (Frankfurt, 2005)
 van den Bergh van Eysinga, G.A., 1963, "Aus einer unveröffentlichten Biographie von Bruno Bauer. Bruno Bauer in Bonn 1839–1842," Annali Feltrinelli
 Waser, Ruedi, 1994, Autonomie des Selbstbewußtseins. Eine Untersuchung zum Verhältnis von Bruno Bauer und Karl Marx (1835–1843) (Tübingen: Francke Verlag).

External links 

 Works by or about Bruno Bauer at Internet Archive
 
 Stan M. Landry, "From Orthodoxy to Atheism: The Apostasy of Bruno Bauer, 1835–1843", Journal of Religion & Society 13 (Un. of Arizona, 2011)
 The Hegel Society of America
 Albert Schweitzer, The Quest of the Historical Jesus, ch. XI, Bruno Bauer (1906)
 David McLocklan, "Bauer, Marx and religion", in libcom.org
 David McLocklan, "Stirner, Feurbach, Marx and the Young Hegelians", libcom.org
 Frederick Engels,"Bruno Bauer and Early Christianity" (1882)
 Robert M. Price, review, "Bruno Bauer, Christ and the Caesars"

1809 births
1882 deaths
Christ myth theory
19th-century German theologians
19th-century philosophers
19th-century German philosophers
People from Saxe-Altenburg
Academic staff of the University of Bonn
German male non-fiction writers
19th-century German historians
Christ myth theory proponents
19th-century atheists
Atheist philosophers